The 12590 / 89 Secunderabad Junction–Gorakhpur Junction Express is a Superfast express train belonging to Indian Railways North Eastern Railway zone that runs between  and  in India.

It operates as train number 12590 from Secunderabad Junction to Gorakhpur Junction and as train number 12589 in the reverse direction, serving the states of Telangana, Maharashtra, Madhya Pradesh & Uttar Pradesh.

Coaches
The 12590 / 89  Express has one AC 2-tier, four AC 3-tier, 11 sleeper class, four general unreserved & two SLR (seating with luggage rake) coaches and two high capacity parcel van coaches. It does not carry a pantry car.

As is customary with most train services in India, coach composition may be amended at the discretion of Indian Railways depending on demand.

Service

Routing

Traction
As the route is electrified, an Lallaguda-based WAP-4 pulls the train for its entire journey.

See also
 Gorakhpur–Yesvantpur Express

References

External links
12590 Secunderabad Gorakhpur Express at India Rail Info
12589 Gorakhpur Secunderabad Express at India Rail Info

Express trains in India
Transport in Secunderabad
Rail transport in Telangana
Rail transport in Maharashtra
Rail transport in Madhya Pradesh
Passenger trains originating from Gorakhpur